Weide is a surname, and may refer to:

 German name of the Widawa River in Poland
 Hu Weide (1863–1933), Chinese politician and diplomat

Family name 
 Robert B. Weide (born 1959), American writer, producer, and director
 Sander van der Weide (born 1976), field hockey player

See also
 Van der Weide, Dutch surname

German words and phrases
German-language surnames